Tal Ma'abi (born 15 May 1985) is an Israeli footballer.

Honours
Israeli Second Division:
Winner (1): 2005–06
Israel State Cup:
Winner (1): 2013
Runner-up (1): 2007
Israeli Premier League:
Runner-up (1): 2007-08

Club career statistics
(correct as of 5 September 2014)

References

1985 births
Living people
Israeli Jews
Israeli footballers
Maccabi Haifa F.C. players
Maccabi Herzliya F.C. players
Hapoel Ashkelon F.C. players
Maccabi Netanya F.C. players
Maccabi Petah Tikva F.C. players
Hapoel Ramat Gan F.C. players
Maccabi Jaffa F.C. players
Beitar Kfar Saba F.C. players
Israeli Premier League players
Liga Leumit players
Footballers from Haifa
Association football defenders